Jc Beall is an American philosopher, formerly the Board of Trustees Distinguished Professor of Philosophy at the University of Connecticut. As of late 2020 Beall holds the O’Neill Family Chair of Philosophy at the University of Notre Dame.

Work

Beall is best known in philosophy for contributions to philosophical logic (particularly non-classical logic) and to the philosophy of logic. Beall, together with Greg Restall (a Melbourne logician and philosopher), is a pioneer of a widely discussed version of logical pluralism, according to which any given natural language has not one but many relations of logical consequence. Beall is also widely known for advocating a glut-theoretic account (see: dialetheism) of deflationary truth (Spandrels of Truth (2009)).

Against the standard no-gap tradition in glut theory, also known as dialetheism (a neologism coined by philosophers Richard Sylvan and Graham Priest), Beall's early and post-2013 work advocates a gluts-and-gaps account of language, advocating not only the existence of truth-value gluts but also of truth-value gaps. The adoption of both gaps and gluts distinguishes Beall from other researchers in a broadly glut-theoretic ("dialethic") framework, who usually accept only gluts.

References

External links
Personal website

1966 births
Living people
Philosophers from Connecticut
University of Connecticut faculty
University of Massachusetts Amherst College of Humanities and Fine Arts alumni
Princeton Theological Seminary alumni
Australian National University alumni